La professoressa di scienze naturali (Professor of Natural Sciences) is a 1976 commedia sexy all'italiana directed by Michele Massimo Tarantini.

Cast 
Lilli Carati: Stefania Marini
Michele Gammino: Baron Fifì Cacciapupolo
Giacomo Rizzo: prof. Straziota
Alvaro Vitali: Peppino Cariglia
Ria De Simone: Immacolata
Gianfranco Barra: preside
Marco Gelardini: Andrea Balsamo
Gastone Pescucci: Nicola Balsamo
Gianfranco D'Angelo: Genesio
Mario Carotenuto: Don Antonio

See also    
 List of Italian films of 1976

References

External links

1976 films
Commedia sexy all'italiana
Films directed by Michele Massimo Tarantini
Italian coming-of-age films
Italian high school films
1970s sex comedy films
Films scored by Alessandro Alessandroni
1976 comedy films
1970s Italian films